Apesdown is a hamlet on the Isle of Wight towards the west in an area known as West Wight. There is an old granary in the area, built on staddle stones. Public transport is provided by Southern Vectis on route X11.

Hamlets on the Isle of Wight